Hypopygus is a genus of South American gymnotiform knifefishes native to the Amazon, Orinoco and upper Paraguay basins, as well as rivers in the Guianas. They are often common, and found near submerged roots, aquatic vegetation and leaf-litter in streams, edges of rivers and floodplains. They are regularly found among vegetation in floating meadows, a habitat that often contains little oxygen, but they are well-adapted to this.

They are well-camouflaged and brown in color with a banded/mottled pattern. The smallest is H. hoedemani, which is the second-smallest knifefish, after Microsternarchus brevis. They are nocturnal and feed on small invertebrates. During the day they remain hidden, often in groups that may number several dozen individuals.

Taxonomy and species
Hypopygus has traditionally been included in the family Hypopomidae, but a comprehensive molecular study from 2015 showed it belongs in Rhamphichthyidae, and this has been followed by recent authorities.

 Hypopygus benoneae L. A. W. Peixoto, Dutra, de Santana & Wosiacki, 2013
 Hypopygus hoedemani de Santana & Crampton, 2011 (Hoedeman's Hypopygus)
 Hypopygus isbruckeri de Santana & Crampton, 2011 (Isbrücker's Hypopygus)
 Hypopygus lepturus Hoedeman, 1962
 Hypopygus minissimus de Santana & Crampton, 2011
 Hypopygus neblinae Mago-Leccia, 1994
 Hypopygus nijsseni de Santana & Crampton, 2011 (Nijssen's Hypopygus)
 Hypopygus ortegai de Santana & Crampton, 2011 (Ortega's Hypopygus)

References

Hypopomidae
Freshwater fish of South America
Freshwater fish genera
Ray-finned fish genera